Tsanev is a surname. Notable people with the surname include:

 Nikola Tsanev (1939–2004), Bulgarian footballer 
 Stefan Tsanev (born 1936), Bulgarian writer, known for his essays, plays, poems, and historical novels

See also
 Tanev

Bulgarian-language surnames